Lance Taylor may refer to:
 OG Boo Dirty, an American rapper named Lance Taylor
 Lance Taylor (American football), American gridiron football coach
 Lance Taylor (economist), American structuralist macroeconomist
 Lance Taylor (footballer) (born 1952), Australian rules footballer